Bodo's Power Systems, also known as Bodo's Power Systems Magazine,  is a German monthly news magazine focusing exclusively on power electronics and is published in Laboe. The editor-in-chief is Bodo Arlt.

Overview
Bodo's Power Systems was established in 2006. The magazine is part of A Media. It offers access to general power electronics information, industry news, and company specific solutions for power electronics applications. Articles are written as contributions by technology experts from the industry.

Cost of usage 
Bodo's Power Systems is financed by advertisements, and paper copies are distributed according to a free-of-charge subscription list.

PowerGuru 
In June 2012, the web-based power electronics information platform PowerGuru started a cooperation with Bodo's Power Systems and provides a fully searchable, categorizable, and commentable archive of all Bodo's Power Systems articles since its establishment in 2006.

EE Power  
In May 2016, Bodo's Power Systems partnered with EE Power, which is now the exclusive English language digital channel for the magazine's content.

References

External links
 
 Online Archive

2006 establishments in Germany
English-language magazines
News magazines published in Germany
Monthly magazines published in Germany
Magazines established in 2006
Online magazines
Professional and trade magazines